Confidence is a 1922 American silent comedy film directed by Harry A. Pollard and starring Herbert Rawlinson, Harriet Hammond and Lincoln Plumer.

Cast
 Herbert Rawlinson as Bob Mortimer
 Harriet Hammond as Miriam Wiggins
 Lincoln Plumer as Prof. Lang
 William A. Carroll as Homer Waldron
 Otto Hoffman as Josiah Wiggins
 William Robert Daly as Ephraim Bates
 Hallam Cooley as Elmer Tuttle
 John Steppling as Henry Tuttle
 Melbourne MacDowell as 	J.D. Sprowl
 Gerald Pring as Henry Taylor
 Robert Milasch as Bige Miller
 Margaret Campbell as Mrs. Waldron
 Sam Allen as Const. Kittering

References

Bibliography
 Connelly, Robert B. The Silents: Silent Feature Films, 1910-36, Volume 40, Issue 2. December Press, 1998.
 Munden, Kenneth White. The American Film Institute Catalog of Motion Pictures Produced in the United States, Part 1. University of California Press, 1997.

External links
 

1922 films
1922 comedy films
1920s English-language films
American silent feature films
Silent American comedy films
Films directed by Harry A. Pollard
American black-and-white films
Universal Pictures films
1920s American films